Cai Li (born 14 August 1987 in Zhejiang) is a Chinese swimmer, who competed for Team China at the 2008 Summer Olympics.

Major achievements
2005 National Games - 1st 50 m free;
2005 East Asian Games - 1st 50 m free;
2006 Asian Games - 3rd 50 m free

Records
2005 National Short-Course Championships - 48.05, 100 m free (AR);
2008 National Champions Tournament - 3:17.07, 4×100 m free relay (AR)

References

 http://2008teamchina.olympic.cn/index.php/personview/personsen/805

External links

1987 births
Living people
Chinese male freestyle swimmers
Swimmers from Zhejiang
Olympic swimmers of China
Swimmers at the 2008 Summer Olympics
Asian Games medalists in swimming
Swimmers at the 2006 Asian Games
Asian Games silver medalists for China
Asian Games bronze medalists for China
Medalists at the 2006 Asian Games